The Silicon Valley Classic, sponsored by Mubadala Investment Company, is a week-long tennis tournament on the WTA Tour held on the campus of San Jose State University in San Jose, California, United States. Started in 1971, the tournament is the oldest women's-only tournament in the world and is played on outdoor hardcourts. It is the first women's tournament in the annual US Open Series.

The tournament started out as the British Motor Cars Invitation in 1971 on the Virginia Slims circuit. Prior to 1978, the tournament was known as the Virginia Slims of San Francisco. The tournament was sponsored by Bank of the West from 1992 to 2017, and held on the campus of Stanford University from 1997 to 2017, and run by Dick Gould.
Martina Navratilova holds the record for the most singles titles:  five (1979–1980, 1988, 1991, and 1993). It is owned and operated by IMG. Since 2014 the event is scheduled a week after the normal collocation, in place of previous tournament Southern California Open.

While commonly known as the Stanford Classic from 1997–2017, the event moved to San Jose State University in 2018 and received a new sponsor, Mubadala Investment Company. It was renamed as the Silicon Valley Classic.

Past finals

Singles

Doubles

Date, name and venue history

References

External links
 

 
Women's tennis tournaments in the United States
Hard court tennis tournaments
WTA Tour
Stanford University
US Open Series
Recurring sporting events established in 1971
Sports in Stanford, California
1971 establishments in California